Nebria cordicollis escheri is a subspecies of ground beetle in the Nebriinae subfamily that can be found in Italy and Switzerland.

References

cordicollis escheri
Beetles described in 1837
Beetles of Europe